This is a comprehensive discography of official recordings by Cavo, an American hard rock band from St. Louis, Missouri. Cavo has released three studio albums, five extended plays, eight singles and five music videos.

Albums

Studio albums

Extended plays

Singles

Music videos

Notes

References

Discographies of American artists
Pop music group discographies